Ignacio López may refer to:

 Saint Ignatius of Loyola (Íñigo Oñaz López de Loyola, 1491–1556), founder of the Society of Jesus (Jesuits)
 Ignacio López de Ayala (1739–1789), Spanish writer, astronomer, and historian
 Ignacio López Rayón (1773–1832), leader of the revolutionary government, during the Mexican War of Independence
 Nacho López (1923–1986), Mexican photojournalist
 Ignacio López Tarso (1925–2023), Mexican actor
 Ignacio López Iglesias (born 1987), Spanish footballer

See also
Estadio Ignacio López Rayón, football stadium in Michoacán, Mexico